The British School of Costa Rica is an independent, bilingual, international school in San José, Costa Rica.

Founded in 1981 by the present Directors General, David and Liliana Lloyd, the school is accredited by the New England Association of Schools and Colleges (NEASC) and authorised by the Costa Rican Ministry of Education.  It offers an International Education system, including the International Early Years Curriculum (IEYC), International Primary Curriculum (IPC), the International Middle Years Curriculum (IMYC), the International General Certificate of Secondary Education (IGCSE) delivered mainly in English and the International Baccalaureate (IB) Diploma delivered in both Spanish and English.

In 1991 the school became the first to offer the IB Diploma programme in Costa Rica (IB Code 0608) and remains the only Centre (CR002) for the Cambridge Board (CIE) IGCSE examinations in the country.  Almost every year one or more of the graduating students of the School obtain 40+ points (Oxbridge entrance) in the IB Diploma programme where over 95% of all candidates obtain the full Diploma qualification, maintaining an average result in the 31 to 33 points range.  Since 1998, 3 students have obtained the maximum points (45) in the IB Diploma programme.  Students of the School consistently maintain a passing rate of 90% in the IGCSE examinations.

The school holds an Independent Operator's license for the Duke of Edinburgh's International Award for Young People, a programme which promotes personal development through Social Service, Expeditions, Skills and Recreation.

External links

 The British School of Costa Rica
 IB Diploma
  Cambridge IGCSE programme
 International Early Years Curriculum
 International Primary Curriculum
 International Middle Years Curriculum
 Duke of Edinburgh's International Award

British international schools in North America
International schools in Costa Rica
Educational institutions established in 1981
International Baccalaureate schools in Costa Rica
1981 establishments in Costa Rica